Synthetic ecosystems are on-chip integrated devices where cellular cultures (individuals) and ecosystem services - such as the renewal of growth, delivery of  regulatory signals as well as removal of waste - are patterned into an integrated fluidic device using principles of landscape ecology, physiology and cell signaling.

References  
Klitgord N, Segrè D (2010) Environments that Induce Synthetic Microbial Ecosystems. PLoS Comput Biol 6(11): e1001002. doi:10.1371/journal.pcbi.1001002

Systems ecology